Stirling is a NJ Transit station in the Stirling neighborhood of Long Hill Township, New Jersey along the Gladstone Branch of the Morris and Essex line. The station consists of one side platform, as well as a concrete block shelter constructed in August 1974 after the former Delaware, Lackawanna and Western Railroad depot was demolished. The Erie Lackawanna Railroad demolished the old depot on August 14, 1972 without notifying then-Passaic Township.

Station layout
The only physical facility at this station is a cinder-block-walled, shingle-roofed bench shelter facing the track. A pay telephone and a newsstand stand nearby. The low-level side platform connects to the bypass track via a walkway over the station track, allowing passengers to access trains on both tracks.

References

External links

Long Hill Township, New Jersey
NJ Transit Rail Operations stations
Former Delaware, Lackawanna and Western Railroad stations
Railway stations in the United States opened in 1872
1872 establishments in New Jersey
Railway stations in Morris County, New Jersey